Theodota of Philippi (died 318) was a Greek harlot and martyr. 
Her feast day is 29 September.

Smith Lewis's translation

Agnes Smith Lewis (1843–1926) in her Select Narratives of Holy Women: Translation: From the Syro-Antiochene Or Sinai Palimpsest wrote,

Butler's account

The hagiographer Alban Butler (1710–1773) wrote in his Lives of the Fathers, Martyrs, and Other Principal Saints under September 29,

Notes

Citations

Sources

 
 

Saints from Roman Greece
4th-century Christian martyrs
318 deaths
3rd-century births